Live 2009 may refer to:
 Live 2009 (Mostly Autumn album)
 Live 2009, Wayne Toups & Zydecajun
 Live 2009 (EP), an EP by Aloud